Mark Colville may refer to:
 Mark Colville (activist), American social justice activist and Catholic worker
 Mark Colville, 4th Viscount Colville of Culross, British judge and politician